Request may refer to:
 a question, a request for information
 a petition, a formal document demanding something that is submitted to an authority. 

Request may also refer to:

Computing and technology
 in computer science, a message sent between objects
 in computer science, a request in Hypertext Transfer Protocol
 Request TV, a defunct pay-per-view service
 Requests (software), a Python HTTP library

Albums
 Request (The Awakening album), a 1997 album by South African band The Awakening
 Request (Juju album), a 2010 cover album by Japanese singer Juju
 Requests, an album by The Johnson Mountain Boys
 Requests, a classical album by Victor Borge
 Requests, a 1964 Parlophone EP by The Beatles; "Long Tall Sally" "I Call Your Name" "Can't Buy Me Love" "You Can't Do That"
 Requests, a 1965 EP by Pat Carroll
 Further Requests, the second 1964 Parlophone EP by The Beatles; "She Loves You", "I Want To Hold Your Hand", "Roll Over Beethoven", "Can't Buy Me Love"
 Requests, an album by Gracie Fields
 Requests, an album by Jim McDonough

Other uses
 "Requests", a song by Dr. Dre
 Request (broadcasting), audience interaction in broadcasting
 ReQuest Dance Crew, a hip hop dance crew from New Zealand

See also
 Request–response